The following outline is provided as an overview and topical guide to linguistics:

Linguistics is the scientific study of natural language. Someone who engages in this study is called a linguist. Linguistics can be theoretical or applied.

Branches of linguistics

Subfields of linguistics 
 General linguistics
 Syntax - the property of grammar that governs sentence structure 
 Semantics - the study of meaning as encoded in grammar
 Lexis - the complete set of words in a language
 Morphology - the property of sound and meaning dynamics in language
 Pragmatics - the study of how context contributes to meaning 
 Theoretical linguistics - the study of language as an abstract object
 Generative linguistics - an approach which seeks to ground grammar in a specialized language module
 Formalism (linguistics) - the theory of language as a formal system with mathematical-logical rules and a formal grammar
 Functional linguistics - language as used and coming from use
 Quantitative linguistics - the study of quantitative language laws and corresponding general theories
 Formal semantics - the study of semantics through formal logic-based models
 Descriptive linguistics - describing how a particular language is used
 Anthropological linguistics - the place of language in its wider social and cultural context, and its role in making and maintaining cultural practices and societal structures
 Historical linguistics - study of historical language change over time 
 Comparative linguistics - comparing languages to find similarities and historical connections
 Phonology - the usage of vocalized sounds and systems of sounds to form language
 Graphemics - the study of language writing systems
 Phonetics - the study of the speech faculty 
 Graphetics - the study of writing shapes as assigned to sounds or ideas
 Etymology - the study of word histories and origins 
 Sociolinguistics - the study of society's effects on language
 Applied linguistics - finding solutions to real-life problems related to language
 Computational linguistics - the use of computation applied to language databasing, analysis, translation, and synthesis
 Forensic linguistics - language science applied to the processes of law and justice
 Internet linguistics - the study of language usage on the Internet 
 Language assessment - assessing first or second language faculty in individuals 
 Language documentation - comprehensive description of the grammar and use practices of languages of a particular group
 Language revitalization - is an attempt to halt or reverse the decline of a language or to revive an extinct one
 Language education - teaching specific language and language science
 Linguistic anthropology - study of how language influences social life
 Psycholinguistics - is the study of the psychological and neurobiological factors that enable humans to acquire, use, comprehend and produce language
 Cognitive linguistics - an approach which seeks to ground grammar in general cognition
 Language acquisition - the study of how children and adults acquire language knowledge and ability
 Language development - the study of early language formation
 Second-language acquisition - the study of how a second language is learned

Subfields, by linguistic structures studied 
Sub-fields of structure-focused linguistics include:

 Phonetics – study of the physical properties of speech (or signed) production and perception
 Phonology – study of sounds (or signs) as discrete, abstract elements in the speaker's mind that distinguish meaning
 Morphology – study of internal structures of words and how they can be modified
 Syntax – study of how words combine to form grammatical sentences
 Semantics – study of the meaning of words (lexical semantics) and fixed word combinations (phraseology), and how these compose to form the meanings of sentences
 Pragmatics – study of how utterances are used in communicative acts – and the role played by context and nonlinguistic knowledge in the transmission of meaning
 Discourse analysis – analysis of language use in texts (spoken, written, or signed)
 Linguistic typology – comparative study of the similarities and differences between language structures in the world's languages.

Subfields, by nonlinguistic factors studied 
 Applied linguistics – study of language-related issues applied in everyday life, notably language policies, planning, and education. (Constructed language fits under Applied linguistics.)
 Biolinguistics – the study of the biological and evolutionary components of human language.
 Clinical linguistics – application of linguistic theory to the field of Speech-Language Pathology.
 Computational linguistics – study of linguistic issues in a way that is 'computationally responsible', i.e., taking careful note of computational consideration of algorithmic specification and computational complexity, so that the linguistic theories devised can be shown to exhibit certain desirable computational properties implementations.
 Developmental linguistics – study of the development of linguistic ability in individuals, particularly the acquisition of language in childhood.
 Historical linguistics – study of language change over time. Also called diachronic linguistics.
 Language geography – study of the geographical distribution of languages and linguistic features.
 Neurolinguistics – study of the structures in the human brain that underlie grammar and communication.
 Psycholinguistics – study of the cognitive processes and representations underlying language use.
 Sociolinguistics – study of variation in language and its relationship with social factors.
 Stylistics – study of linguistic factors that place a discourse in context.

Other subfields of linguistics
 Contrastive linguistics
 Corpus linguistics
 Dialectology
 Discourse analysis
 Grammar
 Interlinguistics
 Language learning
 Language teaching
 Language for specific purposes
 Lexicology
 Orthography
 Rhetoric
 Text linguistics

Schools, movements, and approaches of linguistics
 Cognitive linguistics
 Danish functional linguistics
 Functionalism
 Generative grammar
 Geneva School
 Interactional linguistics
 Kazan School
 Neogrammarian
 Prague linguistic circle
 Prescription and description
 Soviet linguistics
 Stratificational linguistics
 Structural linguistics
 Systemic functional linguistics
 SIL International
 Tagmemics

Related fields 
 Semiotics – investigates the relationship between signs and what they signify more broadly. From the perspective of semiotics, language can be seen as a sign or symbol, with the world as its representation.

 Terminology - is the study of terms and their use.
 Terminology science - study of special vocabulary

 Philosophy of language - takes a philosophical approach to language. Many formal semanticists are philosophers of language, differing from linguist semanticists only in their metaphysical assumptions (if at all).
 Philosophical logic

History of linguistics

History of linguistics
 Unsolved problems in linguistics

Timeline of discovery of basic linguistics concepts
When were the basic concepts first described and by whom?
 Ancient Sanskrit grammarians
 Ancient Greek study of language
 Roman elaborations of Greek study
 Medieval philosophical work in Latin
 Beginnings of modern linguistics in the 19th century
 Behaviorism and mental tabula rasa hypothesis
 Chomsky and the cognitive revolution
 The Linguistics Wars
 Compositional formal semantics arises from the work of Richard Montague and Barbara Partee
 Alternate syntactic systems develop in 80s
 Computational linguistics becomes feasible the late 80s
 Neurolinguistics and the biological basis of cognition
 Deep learning in the 2010s

Questions in linguistics

 What is language?
 How did it/does it evolve?
 How does language serve as a medium of communication?
 How does language serve as a medium of thinking?
 What is common to all languages?
 How do languages differ?

Basic concepts
What basic concepts / terms do I have to know to talk about linguistics?
 Morphology
 morpheme, inflection, paradigm, declension, derivation, compound
 Phonology
 phoneme, allophone, segment, mora, syllable, foot, stress, tone
 Grammar
 tense, aspect, mood and modality, grammatical number, grammatical gender, case
 Syntax
 phrase, clause, grammatical function, grammatical voice
 Lexicology
 word, lexeme, lemma, lexicon, vocabulary, terminology
 Semantics
 meaning, sense, entailment, truth condition, compositionality
 Pragmatics
 presupposition, implicature, deixis

Languages of the world

Languages by continent and country

Linguistics scholars

People who had a significant influence on the development of the field
 J.L. Austin
 Leonard Bloomfield
 Franz Bopp
 Noam Chomsky
 Jean Berko Gleason
 Joseph Greenberg
 Paul Grice
 M.A.K. Halliday
 Louis Hjelmslev
 Roman Jakobson
 Sir William Jones
 William Labov
 George Lakoff
 Ronald Langacker
 Richard Montague
 Pāṇini
 Barbara Partee
 Kenneth L. Pike
 Rasmus Rask
 Edward Sapir
 Ferdinand de Saussure
 August Schleicher
 Lucien Tesnière
 Nikolai Trubetzkoy
 Benjamin Lee Whorf

Linguistics lists
 Languages
 Language families and languages
 ISO 639
 Official languages
 Definitions by language
 Alphabets & Orthography

 Ideograms - Chinese and Japanese
 Syllabaries - Korean 
 Mixed: Ancient Egyptian 
 Common misspellings
 English words without rhymes
 Acronym
 Wiktionary:Definitions of acronyms and abbreviations

The placement of linguistics within broader frameworks

Linguistics can be described as an academic discipline and, at least in its theoretical subfields, as a field of science, being a widely recognized category of specialized expertise, embodying its own terminology, nomenclature, and scientific journals. Many linguists, such as David Crystal, conceptualize the field as being primarily scientific. 

Linguistics is a multi-disciplinary field of research that combines tools from natural sciences, social sciences, formal sciences, and the humanities.

Historically, there has been some lack of consensus on the disciplinary classification of linguistics, particularly theoretical linguistics. Linguistic realists viewed linguistics as a formal science; linguistic nominalists (the American structuralists) viewed linguistics as an empirical or even physical science; linguistic conceptualists viewed linguistics as a branch of psychology and therefore a social science; others yet have argued for viewing linguistics as a mixed science.

Linguistics is heterogeneous in its methods of research, so that each area of theoretical linguistics may resemble methodologically either formal science or empirical science, to different degrees. For example, phonetics uses empirical approaches to study the physical acoustics of spoken language. On the other hand, semantically and grammatically, the usability of a formal or natural language is dependent on a formal and arbitrary axiomatization of rules or norms. Furthermore, as studied in pragmatics and semiotics, linguistic meaning is influenced by social context.

To enable communication by upholding a lexico-semantic norm, the speakers of a shared language need to agree on the meaning of a sequence of phonemes; for instance, "aunt" (/æ/, /n/, /t/) would be acknowledged to signify "parent's sister or parent's sister-in-law", instead of "drummer" or "guest". Likewise, grammatically, it may be necessary for the interlocutors to agree on the morphological and syntactic properties of the sequence; say, that the sequence (/æ/ , /n/, /t/) would be treated as a singular noun convertible morphologically to plurality by the addition of the suffix -s, or that as a noun it must not be modified syntactically by an adverb (for instance, "Let's call our immediately aunt" would thus be recognized as a grammatically incoherent structure, in a manner similar to a mathematically undefined expression).

See also

 Number of words in English
 Lexicography

References

External links
 Glottopedia, MediaWiki-based encyclopedia of linguistics, under construction
 Subfields according to the Linguistic Society of America
 Glossary of linguistic terms and French<->English glossary at SIL International
 "Linguistics" section of A Bibliography of Literary Theory, Criticism and Philology, ed. J. A. García Landa (University of Zaragoza, Spain)
 Linguistics and language-related wiki articles on Scholarpedia and Citizendium

 
 
Applied linguistics
Wikipedia missing topics
Linguistics
Linguistics
Linguistics